The Ice Road is a 2021 American action thriller film written and directed by Jonathan Hensleigh. The film stars Liam Neeson as Mike McCann, and Laurence Fishburne as Jim Goldenrod with Benjamin Walker, Amber Midthunder, Marcus Thomas, Holt McCallany, Martin Sensmeier, Matt McCoy, and Matt Salinger in supporting roles. It marks Hensleigh's first film since 2011's Kill the Irishman. It follows a team of truck drivers on a dangerous mission over frozen lakes and winter roads to deliver a crucial component to save workers trapped in a collapsed diamond mine. The film was digitally released by Netflix in the United States and Canada, and by Amazon Prime Video in the United Kingdom on June 25, 2021. The film received mixed reviews from critics.

Plot

An explosion at a mine in Manitoba traps 26 miners. Mike McCann and his brother Gurty, an Iraq War veteran suffering from PTSD and aphasia, work for a trucking company in North Dakota until Mike punches another trucker for making fun of Gurty’s cognitive disability, and they are both fired. Mike hears about ice road truckers needed in Winnipeg, and they apply. Jim Goldenrod, another trucker, agrees to lead a rescue mission to deliver wellheads to the mine. He hires McCann and Gurty, along with a young Indigenous woman known only as Tantoo. Also joining the rescue mission is actuary Varnay, responsible for insurance risk assessment for Katka, the company which owns the mine. $200,000 is split between the four truckers, which will be redistributed among the survivors if anyone dies. Meanwhile, the miners are communicating with Katka executives using Tap code, and Katka General Manager Sickle transmits a message that they plan to free the men by blasting a tunnel.

The team leaves for the mine with three wellheads. During the trip, Goldenrod's engine seizes. While attempting to repair it, the ice beneath his trailer breaks and his leg gets trapped. Knowing he can't escape, he convinces Tantoo to sever the strap attaching him to the truck, causing him to drown but saving the other two rigs and wellheads. In an attempt to flee the rapidly approaching pressure wave and cracking ice, the remaining two trucks fishtail and roll over, stopping the pressure wave.

Varnay convinces Mike to accuse Tantoo of sabotaging Goldenrod's rig, but Tantoo reveals her brother Cody is amongst the miners. When they continue to interrogate her, she pulls out a pistol, but Gurty disarms her and ties her up. After the men right the trucks, Varnay locks Mike and Gurty in the back of their rig. Varnay is revealed to have been the one who sabotaged Goldenrod's rig, and knocks Tantoo unconscious. He rigs Mike's truck with dynamite and drives off with Tantoo, but Mike and Gurty escape from the trailer and throw the dynamite away just before it explodes. Varnay watches the explosion from afar, believing that Mike and Gurty are dead.

While winching their trailer out of the ice, Gurty tries to warn Mike the winch will fail, but Mike starts the machine anyway. The winch snaps, causing Gurty and the trailer to fall into the water, but Mike rescues Gurty. Varnay meets with Sickle, telling him Mike and Gurty have died. Sickle instructs Varnay to get rid of Tantoo and the last remaining wellhead by making it seem Tantoo lost control and veered off a cliff. Varnay prepares to kill Tantoo, but is bitten by Gurty's pet rat Skeeter, enabling Tantoo to throw him out of the rig. Mike and Gurty arrive and kill the Katka contractors pursuing Tantoo.

After Tantoo runs out of fuel due to Varnay disconnecting her fuel equalizer, he catches up to her, but Mike crashes his rig into Varnay's truck, sending it off a cliff. Varnay survives and creates an avalanche with dynamite. Mike and Gurty escape, but Tantoo is hit by snow and wounded by a branch. They uncouple her trailer, and drive off with the wellhead. Varnay pursues them in Tantoo's rig and begins ramming them. Mike boards Varnay's rig and both fall from the truck. After a struggle, Mike attempts to drive away, but Varnay climbs onto the rig. Mike knocks Varnay out, accelerates the rig, and jumps out, causing it to fall through the surface and kill Varnay. Meanwhile, Tantoo and Gurty cross a bridge not designed for the weight of the truck, and barely make it over before the bridge collapses. After crossing, the truck starts sliding backwards, and Gurty is crushed trying to prevent the truck from falling. Mike arrives and comforts a dying Gurty. Mike and Tantoo arrive just in time to rescue the miners. After learning the truth, the Katka CEO fires Sickle, who is arrested for his actions.

Three months later, Tantoo is seen working in Goldenrod's garage as a mechanic. Mike visits her in his new gold truck, which he drives as an independent contractor to deliver sporting goods. As he drives off, he is seen tending to Skeeter and his license plate reads "TRK TRK TRK", in honor of Gurty's chosen name for a truck.

Cast

Production
Filming occurred in Winnipeg in February 2020. Filming also occurred in Île-des-Chênes and Gimli, Manitoba.

Music

Hensleigh asked Big Machine Records to create a multi-genre soundtrack album for the film. Scott Borchetta, founder of the record label, wanted a psychobilly song as the basis for the soundtrack, and contacted Nikki Sixx to executively produce. As a result, Nikki Sixx formed supergroup L.A. Rats along with Rob Zombie, John 5 and Tommy Clufetos, and they released a cover version of "I've Been Everywhere" as a single on May 21, 2021. "We Got Fight", which was released on May 26, is Gary LeVox's debut solo single and plays over the film's end credits. The album also contains covers of songs by Johnny Cash, The Cars, Dave Dudley, Hank Snow, and Kathy Mattea.

Release
In March 2021, Netflix acquired the U.S. distribution rights to the film for $18 million, and it was digitally released on the service on June 25, 2021. It was the most-streamed film on the service in its debut weekend. Distributors will vary in other countries, including Amazon Prime Video in the United Kingdom.

Reception
On review aggregator website Rotten Tomatoes, the film holds an approval rating of 44% based on 89 reviews, with an average rating of 4.8/10. The website's critical consensus reads, "Liam Neeson remains a top-tier action hero; unfortunately, like a number of his recent genre outings, The Ice Road is a downhill trundle paved with predictability." On Metacritic, the film has a weighted average score of 42 out of 100 based on 24 critics, indicating "mixed or average reviews".

Alonso Duralde of the TheWrap criticized the "downright laughable VFX" and wrote: "The Ice Road is so often inept and heavy-handed that not even the reliable presence of Liam Neeson can rescue it."

References

External links
 
 

2021 films
2021 action thriller films
American action thriller films
Trucker films
Films set in Manitoba
Films shot in Winnipeg
Films directed by Jonathan Hensleigh
2020s English-language films
2020s American films